James Finlay was a Scotland international rugby union player.

Rugby Union career

Amateur career

Provincial career

Finlay was capped for Edinburgh District, playing in the very first inter-city match in 1872; and captained the side in 1874.

International career

He also played for Edinburgh Academicals.

Family

He was the brother of Arthur Finlay and Ninian Finlay who were also capped for Scotland. They all appeared together once in 1875, in the 0–0 draw against  at Raeburn Place: James winning the last of his four caps, while Arthur and Ninian gained their first caps.

References

Sources

 Bath, Richard (ed.) The Scotland Rugby Miscellany (Vision Sports Publishing Ltd, 2007 )

Scottish rugby union players
Scotland international rugby union players
Edinburgh District (rugby union) players
Edinburgh Academicals rugby union players
1852 births
1930 deaths
Rugby union players from Edinburgh
Rugby union forwards